Gemma McCaw (née Flynn, born 2 May 1990) is a New Zealand field hockey player who has represented her country in three Summer Olympics (2008, 2012, and 2016).

Early life
Born in Tauranga, Gemma McCaw is the youngest child and only daughter of Rob and Michelle Flynn. Of Māori descent, McCaw affiliates to Te Arawa. She attended Tauranga Intermediate School and Tauranga Girls' College, and studied sports science at Massey University.

Hockey
As Gemma Flynn, she has competed for the New Zealand women's national field hockey team (the Black Sticks Women) since 2008, including for the team at the 2008 and 2012 Summer Olympics, 2016 Summer Olympics and at the 2010 and 2014 Commonwealth Games. In 2009 she was nominated for the FIH Women's Young Player of the Year. At both the 2012 and 2016 Olympics, her team lost the bronze medal game and thus came fourth. She was part of the team which made it to the final game of the FIH World League in 2015, but the team lost 5–1 against Argentina.

Following the 2016 Summer Olympics, she took an extended break from hockey and later decided to retire. She came out of retirement in November 2019. In February 2020, she reached her 250th cap for the national team.  Gemma Mccaw had intentions of competing again in the 2020 Summer Olympics in Tokyo but with it being delayed due to the Covid 19 pandemic decided against it.

Outside hockey
Alongside Luuka Jones, Kane Williamson, Ria Hall, and Tiki Taane, Gemma McCaw is one of the celebrities behind the Bay of Plenty's No Place Like Home tourist campaign launched on 25 January 2016. In October 2016 she became an ambassador for the New Zealand Breast Cancer Foundation.  McCaw is also a Sport New Zealand ambassador.

Personal life
In 2013 it was reported that Flynn was dating All Blacks captain Richie McCaw. She moved to Christchurch in 2014 to be with him, became engaged to him in early 2016, and married him on 14 January 2017. They have two daughters, born in December 2018 and in May 2021.

References

External links
 
 Gemma Flynn profile at 100% Project
 Gemma Flynn Ambassador for New Zealand Breast Cancer Foundation
 Gemma McCaw (née Flynn) Bay of Plenty Tourism
 

1990 births
Living people
People educated at Tauranga Girls' College
Sportspeople from Tauranga
Field hockey players from Christchurch
New Zealand female field hockey players
Olympic field hockey players of New Zealand
Field hockey players at the 2008 Summer Olympics
Field hockey players at the 2012 Summer Olympics
Field hockey players at the 2016 Summer Olympics
Field hockey players at the 2010 Commonwealth Games
Field hockey players at the 2014 Commonwealth Games
Commonwealth Games silver medallists for New Zealand
Commonwealth Games bronze medallists for New Zealand
Te Arawa people
New Zealand Māori sportspeople
Commonwealth Games medallists in field hockey
Massey University alumni
Female field hockey midfielders
21st-century New Zealand women
Medallists at the 2010 Commonwealth Games
Medallists at the 2014 Commonwealth Games